Hassan al-Basri Brigades (Arabic: كتائب حسن البصري) was an Iraqi insurgent group during the Iraq insurgency.

Attacks 
Hassan al-Basri Brigades claimed many Jihadist attacks with Al-Qaeda on their website. This includes the bombing of an Iraqi police patrol in Basra, Iraq. The militant group also assassinated a man by the name of Abdel Hussein Khazaal, who was a correspondent for al-Hurra TV station, and murdered his 4-year-old son who has not been identified.

References 

Insurgent groups in Asia
2007 disestablishments in Iraq
Iraqi insurgency (2003–2011)
Organizations established in 2003
Jihadist groups in Iraq
Defunct organizations based in Iraq